Magpie and the Dandelion is the eighth studio album by folk rock group The Avett Brothers, released on October 15, 2013. The album was produced by Rick Rubin who produced their previous two full-length studio albums, 2009's I and Love and You and 2012's The Carpenter. The band first announced they were working on the album in a June 12, 2013 interview and that the songs were all recorded during The Carpenters recording sessions. The album's title and release date, along with the first single from the album "Another is Waiting," were released on NPR's All Songs Considered on August 8, 2013. All eleven songs became available for streaming on October 9, 2013 on NPR's First Listen.

The album was recorded during the same recording sessions as The Carpenter and in an open letter to fans published on August 8 the band says the album conveys a feeling on "youthful wonder".

The album received generally favorable praise from critics and reached #5 on the U.S. Billboard 200 chart during its first week.

Commercial performance
The album debuted at  No. 5 on the Billboard 200 albums chart on its first week of release, with around 58,000 sold in the United States. It also debuted at No. 1 on Folk Albums, and No. 3 on Rock Albums chart.  As of December 2015, the album has sold 171,000 copies in the US.

Track listing

Personnel
The Avett Brothers
 Scott Yancey Avett - Lead and Backing Vocals, Banjo, Piano, Acoustic Guitar
 Timothy Seth Avett – Lead and Backing Vocals, Acoustic and Electric Guitar, Piano, Organ, Celeste
 Bob Crawford - Upright and Electric Bass, Lead and Backing Vocals
 Joseph Kwon – Cello

All songs performed by The Avett Brothers with help from...
 Jacob Edwards (drums on 1, 3, 4, 6, 8, 10)
 Lenny Castro (percussion on 1, 2, 4, 5, 7, 8, 10, 11)
 Chad Smith (drums on 2)
 Steven Nistor (drums on 5, 11)
 Benmont Tench (organ on 2, 7, 8)
 G. Love (harmonica on 1)
 Tania Elizabeth (fiddle on 1)
 ...finale vocals for Morning Song: The Haas Family, Jim Avett, Sarah Avett, Susan Kay Avett, Jessica Lea Mayfield, Aaron "Woody" Wood, Mary Ellen Bush, Jacob Edwards, Stephanie Mirabelli, Charlotte Webb, Hattie Webb.Production'
 Rick Rubin - producer
 Ryan Hewitt - Engineer, Mixing
 Dave Collins - Mastering
 Justin Glanville - Engineer (9)
 Jordan Silva, Jon Ashley, Julian Dreyer, Evan Bradford and Evan Hill - Recording assistants
 Recorded at Echo Mountain Recording, Asheville, NC, Shangri-La Studios, Malibu, CA, Lock Stock Studio, Venice, CA
 Mixed at Lock Stock Studio, Venice, CA
 Additional Engineers - Darren Heelis, Buckley Miller, Craig Welsh, Tucker Martine

Charts

Weekly charts

Year-end charts

Notes and references 

The Avett Brothers albums
2013 albums
Albums produced by Rick Rubin
Albums recorded at Shangri-La (recording studio)